Yugoslavia was present at the Eurovision Song Contest 1970, held in Amsterdam, Netherlands.

Before Eurovision

Jugovizija 1970 
The Yugoslav national final to select their entry, was held on 14 February at the TV Belgrade Studios in Belgrade. The host was Mića Orlović. There were 15 songs in the final, from the five subnational public broadcasters; RTV Ljubljana, RTV Zagreb, RTV Belgrade, RTV Sarajevo, and RTV Skopje. The winner was chosen by the votes of a mixed jury of experts and citizens, one juror from each of the subnational public broadcasters of JRT, and three non-experts - citizens. The winning song was "Pridi, dala ti bom cvet" performed by the Slovene singer Eva Sršen, written by Dušan Velkaverh and composed by Mojmir Sepe.

At Eurovision
Eva Sršen performed 4th on the night of the Contest, following Italy and preceding Belgium. At the close of the voting the song had received 4 points (all from United Kingdom), coming 11th in the field of 12 competing countries.

Voting

Notes

References

External links
Eurodalmatia official ESC club
Eurovision Song Contest National Finals' Homepage
Eurovision France
ECSSerbia.com
OGAE North Macedonia

1970
Countries in the Eurovision Song Contest 1970
Eurovision